An annular solar eclipse occurred on January 15–16, 1991. A solar eclipse occurs when the Moon passes between Earth and the Sun, thereby totally or partly obscuring the image of the Sun for a viewer on Earth. An annular solar eclipse occurs when the Moon's apparent diameter is smaller than the Sun's, blocking most of the Sun's light and causing the Sun to look like an annulus (ring). An annular eclipse appears as a partial eclipse over a region of the Earth thousands of kilometres wide.
Annularity was visible in southwestern Western Australia, Tasmania, New Zealand and French Polynesia. It was visible over Australia as a partial solar eclipse at sunrise on January 16.

Images

Related eclipses

Eclipses of 1991 
 An annular solar eclipse on January 15.
 A penumbral lunar eclipse on January 30.
 A penumbral lunar eclipse on June 27.
 A total solar eclipse on July 11.
 A penumbral lunar eclipse on July 26.
 A partial lunar eclipse on December 21.

Solar eclipses of 1990–1992

Saros 131

Tritos series

Metonic series

Notes

References

1991 1 15
1991 in science
1991 1 15
January 1991 events